Campo do Brito is a municipality in the state of Sergipe, Brazil. 

The municipality contains part of the Serra de Itabaiana National Park.

References

Municipalities in Sergipe